The 2013–14 season of the Primera División de Fútbol Sala is the 25th season of top-tier futsal in Spain. It is the third season under the "Primera División" name. The regular season started on September 12, 2013 and will conclude on April 26, 2014. The championship playoffs will follow the end of the regular season.

Barcelona Alusport are the defending champions by defeating ElPozo Murcia 3–1 in the 2012–13 Championship Final series.

Caja Segovia, for financial reasons, and Puertollano, by finishing in last place, were relegated at the end of the 2012-2013 regular season. Montesinos Jumilla, Peñíscola Bodegas Dunviro, and Jaén Paraíso Interior were promoted from the Segunda División de Futsal for the 2013-2014 season.

At the end of the regular season the top eight teams will play in the championship playoffs.

Inter Movistar became champions by defeating ElPozo Murcia 3–1 in the Final series, winning its overall ninth title and first since 2008.

Teams

Personnel and kits

Stadia and locations

Regular season table

Source: lnfs.es

Championship playoffs

Calendar

Bracket

Quarter-finals

1st leg

2nd leg

3rd leg

Semifinals

1st leg

2nd leg

Inter Movistar wins series 2–0 and advance to Final.

3rd leg

ElPozo Murcia won series 2–1 and advanced to Final.

Final

1st leg

2nd leg

3rd leg

Top scorers
Regular season only

See also
2013–14 Segunda División de Futsal
2013–14 Copa del Rey de Futsal
Futsal in Spain

References

External links
2013–14 season at 

Liga Nacional de Fútbol Sala seasons
1
Futsal
Spain